Luo Zhijun (born 28 November 1951) is a Chinese politician. He is serving as Chairperson of the Chinese People's Political Consultative Conference Agriculture and Rural Affairs Committee since March 2018. He was Vice-Chairperson of the National People's Congress Environment Protection and Resources Conservation Committee from July 2016 until March 2018. He is the former Communist Party Secretary of Jiangsu Province, and prior to that the provincial governor.

Biography 
Luo was born in Lingyuan, Liaoning, the son of Luo Wen, a major general in the People's Liberation Army. Luo joined the army in February 1968 and became a soldier in PLA's North Sea Fleet. He joined the Chinese Communist Party in the next year. In September 1978 he moved to Beijing and became the secretary of Communist Youth League at Beijing Medical Radioactive Machine Factory. He entered China Youth Daily in 1980, and was later promoted to secretary general in that agency.

In September 1995, he was appointed as vice mayor of Nanjing, and was elevated to mayor in 2002. He became the Nanjing municipal party chief in 2003. In December 2007, he was promoted deputy party chief of Jiangsu. On 4 January 2008, he was elected as vice governor and acting governor of Jiangsu Province, and was duly confirmed as Governor by a session of the provincial People's Congress on 31 January 2008. Luo was named the Party Secretary of Jiangsu province in December 2010 following the retirement of Liang Baohua due to age. On 2 July 2016, Luo was appointed as Vice-Chairperson of the National People's Congress Environment Protection and Resources Conservation Committee.

Luo Zhijun is a member of the 18th Central Committee of the Chinese Communist Party, and an alternate member of the 17th Central Committee.

References 

1951 births
Living people
Governors of Jiangsu
Politicians from Chaoyang, Liaoning
Mayors of Nanjing
People's Republic of China politicians from Liaoning
Chinese Communist Party politicians from Liaoning